Adelaide Productions is a television animation division of Sony Pictures Television that was founded on April 12, 1993, by Columbia Pictures Television. It has also been titled Columbia TriStar Television Animation, Columbia TriStar Animation, and Columbia TriStar Children's Television.

As of 2023, Adelaide Productions is currently dormant, since it has not made any animated TV shows since 2014, even though its status is still listed as "active". Its duties have been taken over by Sony Pictures Animation and Silvergate Media.

Filmography

See also
 Sony Pictures Animation
 Screen Gems Cartoons

References

External links
 

Mass media companies established in 1993
Companies based in Culver City, California
Television production companies of the United States
Sony Pictures Television
Sony Pictures Television production companies
Sony Pictures Entertainment
Sony subsidiaries
American animation studios